Adiabatic conductivity is a measure of a material's electrical conductivity, σ, under thermodynamically adiabatic conditions.

See also
Thermodynamics

Thermodynamic properties
Electrical phenomena